Synapse is the name of two different fictional characters appearing in American comic books published by Marvel Comics.

Publication history
The first Synapse, Max Mullins, first appeared in Daredevil #377 (July 1998) and was created by Scott Lobdell and Tom Morgan.

The second Synapse, Emily Guerrero, was introduced as a new member of the Avengers Unity Squad. She first appeared in Uncanny Avengers Vol. 3 #1 (December 2015) and was created by Gerry Duggan and Ryan Stegman.

Fictional character biography

Max Mullins

Max Mullins has the ability to rewire and alter a person's brainwaves to his liking. Taking on the name Synapse he, along with La Concierge and Stilt-Man, were recruited by the Kingpin to form the third incarnation of the Emissaries of Evil. One of the first things he did was shut down Stilt-Man's brain, albeit temporarily, so that he would not reveal his employer's name to Daredevil, who at the time was acting as an agent for S.H.I.E.L.D. and had his mind wiped to think he was Laurent Levasseur. 

While La Concierge was battling Laurent, Synapse was holding Dr. Claudia DuBois hostage along with Wilson Fisk. Tired of being pushed around, Synapse planned on using his powers on Fisk, but Fisk, who had a stronger mind, knew of Synapse's plot and threatened to kill him if he did not continue to work under him. Eventually, Fisk has Synapse use his powers on Laurent, but it instead reminds him that he is Daredevil. He knocks out Synapse with one kick.

Emily Guerrero

Emily Guerrero lived with her younger brother and grandfather, Ivan, when the Terrigen Cloud affected their area. Emily emerged as an Inhuman while her grandfather also emerged where he took the name Shredded Man. Later, she joined the Avengers Unity Squad under Captain America's leadership. Despite being new, Steve Rogers had faith in her even though she and teammate Rogue did not get along very well. She fought Super-Adaptoid by getting a flock of pigeons to take it out.

Powers and abilities
The Max Mullins version of Synapse possesses telepathy, which he uses to rewire and alter a person's brainwaves to his liking.  

The Emily Guerrero version of Synapse possesses telepathy, animal control, enhanced speed and superhuman strength.

References

External links
 Synapse (Max Mullins) at Marvel Wiki
 Synapse (Emily Guerrero) at Marvel Wiki
Max Mullins' profile in the Appendix to the Marvel Handbook
Emily Guerrero's profile in the Appendix to the Marvel Handbook

Articles about multiple fictional characters
Avengers (comics) characters
Characters created by Scott Lobdell
Comics characters introduced in 1998
Comics characters introduced in 2015
Inhumans
Marvel Comics characters who can move at superhuman speeds
Marvel Comics characters with superhuman strength
Marvel Comics female superheroes
Marvel Comics male supervillains
Marvel Comics superheroes
Marvel Comics supervillains
Marvel Comics telepaths